The acronym OHA may refer to:
On hand Always 
DHS Office of Health Affairs, an office in the United States Department of Homeland Security
Oakland Heritage Alliance, a non-profit preservation organization in Oakland, California.
Oakland Housing Authority 
Office of Hawaiian Affairs
Office of Hearings and Appeals, within the US Small Business Administration
Office of Human Affairs, a Community Action Agency serving the residents of Newport News and Hampton, Virginia.
Oklahoma Hospital Association, the state affiliate of the American Hospital Association
Omaha Housing Authority, the government agency responsible for providing public housing in Omaha, Nebraska, USA
Ontario Hockey Association, which governs most junior and senior hockey in Ontario
Ontario Horticultural Association
Ontario Hospital Association
Open Handset Alliance, a consortium of companies dedicated to producing an open standard for mobile devices.
Oral hypoglycemic agents, the majority of anti-diabetic drugs
Oral Health America
Oregon Health Authority
Ormiston Horizon Academy
Oral History Association, a professional association for oral historians
Overseas housing allowance (United States military)
RNZAF Base Ohakea, New Zealand, which uses IATA code OHA

Oha may refer to:
Õha, village in Kaarma Parish, Saare County, Estonia
Ugo Oha, a Nigerian basketball player
 Ofe Oha, a Nigerian soup

See also
Okha, Russia, town in Russia